The Georgetown Loop Railroad is a  narrow gauge United States heritage railroad located in the Rocky Mountains in Clear Creek County, adjacent to Interstate 70 in Colorado.

The railroad is situated near I-70, with Silver Plume Depot sitting adjacent to the eastbound on-ramp. Just east of Silver Plume on I-70 there is a parking area named Georgetown Loop Overlook providing scenic views to motorists. The Clear Creek Greenway Trail access road connects Silver Plume Depot, Georgetown Loop Overlook, and the Devil's Gate Station near Georgetown.  This trail is accessible to bicyclists and hikers.

History
The Georgetown Loop Railroad was one of Colorado's first visitor attractions. This spectacular stretch of  narrow gauge railroad, built by the Georgetown, Breckenridge and Leadville Railway, was completed in 1884 and considered an engineering marvel for its time. The route included horseshoe curves, grades of up to 4%, and four bridges across Clear Creek, including the massive Devil's Gate High Bridge.

The Georgetown, Breckenridge, and Leadville Railroad had been formed in 1881 under the Union Pacific Railroad.

Originally part of the larger line of the Colorado Central Railroad constructed in the 1870s and 1880s, in the wake of the Colorado Gold Rush, this line was also used extensively during the silver boom of the 1880s to haul silver ore from the mines at Silver Plume. In 1893, the Colorado and Southern Railway took over the line and operated it for passengers and freight until 1938.

Between 1906 and 1918, the Georgetown Loop connected with the Argentine Central Railway in Silver Plume, by which tourists could continue onward to the summit of Mount McClellan. Prior to 1916, the Argentine Central also served several large silver mines on the east side of Argentine Pass.

The line was dismantled in 1939, but was restored in the 1980s to operate during summer months as a tourist railroad, carrying passengers using historic  narrow gauge steam locomotives.

Rebuilding
In 1959, the centennial year of the discovery of gold in Georgetown, the Georgetown Loop Historic Mining & Railroad Park was formed by the Colorado Historical Society.

Interest in restoration of the Loop segment as a tourist attraction gained traction in the 1970s, and construction of new track along the old grade began in 1973 with track and ties donated by the Union Pacific Railroad. A new high bridge was also built to the same specifications as the original. Modern development had cut off the route to the old depot in downtown Georgetown, so the new track terminated just below the Loop at Devil's Gate (about 3/4 miles southwest of the city).

The  restored segment, opened on March 10, 1984, is at the upper end of the historic Colorado Central main line up Clear Creek Canyon west of Golden. Passengers can board the train at depots located in Silver Plume and Devils Gate.

The train ride includes an optional walking tour of the Lebanon Silver Mine, located at the halfway point on the railroad, where visitors can walk 500 feet (150 m) into a mine tunnel bored in the 1870s, with guides pointing out once-rich veins of silver and relating the history of the mine.

Operational Troubles and Recovery 
The Loop operated continuously without major issues for 30 years from its rebuilding date until 2004, when contract negotiations between the Colorado Historical Society and the Loop's operator - Georgetown Loop Railroad, Inc. - broke down. GLR rejected the new contract demands and the CHS began seeking out new bids, eventually rewarding Railstar, Inc. with a 10-year management contract. GLR owned all of the original equipment being used on the Loop and moved it all to the Colorado Railroad Museum for storage, leaving Railstar to purchase new equipment to use since they didn't own any narrow-gauge rolling stock at the time they accepted the new contract. The Loop became plagued with problems after the Railstar takeover, including a lack of steam locomotives, derailments that resulted in Federal Railroad Administration investigation, and unreliable equipment that would often break down and leave the railroad closed for days at a time during peak tourist season. At its lowest point, annual Loop ridership under Railstar fell from 130,000 riders per year to 51,000 riders per year. This left both local businesses and railroad enthusiasts very displeased with the state of the railroad.

A particular incident that helped shape the unfavorable perception of the Railstar operation occurred in 2006, when an attempt was made to restore Colorado and Southern Railway steam locomotive #9 to operation on the Loop. The restoration was successful, but Railstar managed the operation of the small locomotive so poorly (mainly by forcing it to pull longer and heavier trains than it was designed for) that they severely damaged the locomotive and rendered it inoperable after less than one summer season. This resulted in #9 being sent back to static display, unlikely to ever run again.

In 2009, the Colorado Historical Society decided to terminate the contract with Railstar and award the remaining time to a new operator, run by a local Georgetown businessman. He founded a new company to handle the operations called Historic Rail Adventures LLC, 
which still operates the Georgetown Loop today. Operations and public relations under HRA have improved greatly, including the return of three operational steam engines and increased reliability and ridership.

See also 

National Register of Historic Places listings in Clear Creek County, Colorado
List of Colorado historic railroads
 List of heritage railroads in the United States

References

External links 

 Georgetown Loop Historic Mining & Railroad Park, Historical information site
 Georgetown Loop Railroad, Tourism site

Railway lines opened in 1884
Heritage railroads in Colorado
3 ft gauge railways in the United States
Narrow gauge railroads in Colorado
Railroad museums in Colorado
Transportation in Clear Creek County, Colorado
Colorado Mining Boom
National Register of Historic Places in Clear Creek County, Colorado
Mining museums in Colorado
History Colorado
Museums in Clear Creek County, Colorado
Railway lines on the National Register of Historic Places
Rail infrastructure on the National Register of Historic Places in Colorado